Cape Colbeck is a prominent ice-covered cape which forms the northwestern extremity of the Edward VII Peninsula and Marie Byrd Land in Antarctica. It was discovered in January 1902 by the British National Antarctic Expedition and named for Captain William Colbeck, Royal Naval Reserve, who commanded Robert Scott's relief ship, the Morning.

Important Bird Area
A 351 ha site on fast ice near the eastern coast of the cape has been identified as an Important Bird Area (IBA) by BirdLife International because it supports a colony of about 11,000 emperor penguins (as estimated from 2009 satellite imagery).

Further reading 
 Bruce P. Luyendyk  Christopher C. Sorlien  Douglas S. Wilson  Louis R. Bartek  Christine S. Siddoway, Structural and tectonic evolution of the Ross Sea rift in the Cape Colbeck region, Eastern Ross Sea, Antarctica, doi.org/10.1029/2000TC001260

References

External links
 

Important Bird Areas of Antarctica
Penguin colonies
Headlands of the Ross Dependency
King Edward VII Land